The 2018 Pacific hurricane season was one of the most active Pacific hurricane seasons on record, producing the highest accumulated cyclone energy value on record in the basin. The season had the fourth-highest number of named storms23, tied with 1982. The season also featured eight landfalls, six of which occurred in Mexico. The season officially began on May 15 in the Eastern Pacific, and on June 1 in the Central Pacific; they both ended on November 30. These dates conventionally delimit the period of each year when most tropical cyclones form in the Pacific basin. However, tropical cyclone formation is possible at any time of the year, as illustrated when the first tropical depression formed on May 10, five days prior to the official start of the season.

The second named storm of the season, Hurricane Bud, struck Baja California Sur in mid-June, causing minor damage. Tropical Storm Carlotta stalled offshore of the Mexican coastline, where it also caused minor damage. In early August, Hurricane Hector became one of the few tropical cyclones to cross into the Western Pacific from the Eastern Pacific, while also affecting Hawaii. Tropical Storm Ileana brought torrential rainfall to southwestern Mexico during early August, causing relatively minor damage. A few weeks later, Hurricane Lane obtained Category 5 intensity while also becoming Hawaii's wettest tropical cyclone on record and the second wettest tropical cyclone in United States history, only behind Hurricane Harvey of the previous year. Hurricane Olivia also struck Hawaii, resulting in relatively minor damage.

In late September, Hurricanes Rosa and Sergio formed, both of which eventually brought thunderstorms and flash flooding to the Baja California Peninsula and the Southwestern United States. Tropical Depression Nineteen-E became the first tropical cyclone to form in the Gulf of California before it brought severe flooding to Sinaloa, Mexico, causing significant damage. Meanwhile, Hurricane Walaka attained Category 5 intensity before causing disruptions in the Northwestern Hawaiian Islands. In late October, Hurricane Willa became the record-tying third Category 5 hurricane of the season (tied with the 1994 and 2002 seasons) before striking Sinaloa as a major hurricane, causing severe damage. Tropical Storm Vicente simultaneously affected the region just south of where Willa made landfall, causing severe flooding and dozens of landslides. Damage across the basin reached $1.58 billion (2018 USD), while 57 people were killed by the various storms.



Seasonal forecasts

The National Oceanic and Atmospheric Administration (NOAA) released its annual forecast on May 24, 2018, predicting an 80% chance of a near- to above-average season in both the Eastern and Central Pacific basins, with a total of 14–20 named storms, 7–12 hurricanes, and 3–7 major hurricanes. The reason for their outlook was the possible development of an El Niño, which reduces vertical wind shear across the basin and increases sea surface temperatures. In addition, many global computer models expected a positive Pacific decadal oscillation (PDO) that had been ongoing since 2014 to continue. PDO is a phase of a multi-decade cycle that favors much warmer than average sea surface temperatures, which is in contrast to the 1995–2013 period, which featured below-normal activity. The Servicio Meteorológico Nacional (SMN) issued its first forecast for the season on May 25, predicting a total of 18 named storms, 6 hurricanes, and 4 major hurricanes to develop.

Seasonal summary

The accumulated cyclone energy (ACE) index for the 2018 Pacific hurricane season as calculated by Colorado State University using data from the National Hurricane Center was 318.1 units, the highest total ACE of any Pacific hurricane season on record. Broadly speaking, ACE is a measure of the power of a tropical or subtropical storm multiplied by the length of time it existed. Therefore, a stronger storm with a longer duration contributes more to the seasonal total than several short-lived, weaker storms combined.

Overall, 26 tropical depressions formed, with 23 reaching tropical storm intensity. Thirteen of the tropical storms became hurricanes, with 10 reaching major hurricane intensity. El Niño-like conditions prevailed across much of the basin, leading to elevated activity. Sea surface temperatures were above average for much of the season, stretching from the coast of North America to near the 150th meridian east. A subpolar gyre located in the Northern Atlantic increased atmospheric convection and reduced vertical wind shear across the Eastern Pacific. Wind shear near Hawaii's Big Island decreased even more after the subtropical jet pushed northward in September. Storms were also kept in more favorable environments by stronger easterlies as a result of an above-normal subtropical ridge.

The season officially began on May 15 in the Eastern Pacific, and on June 1 in the Central Pacific; they both ended on November 30. The season started with the formation of Tropical Depression One-E on May 10, which was five days before the official start of hurricane season in the Eastern Pacific. The month of June saw record activity, with the formation of six tropical cyclonesAletta, Bud, Carlotta, Daniel, Emilia, and Seven-E. With five named systems, the record for most June tropical storms, which was set in 1985, was tied. Aletta and Bud both intensified into Category 4 major hurricanes, marking the first time since 2010 that two occurred in June. Tropical Storm Carlotta moved along the southern coast of Mexico, causing flooding rains. Activity during the month of July was below normal across the basin. Although a total of four tropical depressions formed, only two became stormsFabio and Gilma. Fabio's intensification into a tropical storm on July 1 marked the earliest date of a season's sixth named storm, beating the previous record of July 3 set in both 1984 and 1985.

August was an above-average month for the Eastern Pacific, with a total of seven named storms occurring during the monthHector, Ileana, John, Kristy, Lane, Miriam, and Norman. Forming from a July tropical depression, Hurricane Hector spent more days as a major hurricane than any other storm in the basin. It also had the highest accumulated cyclone energy since Hurricane John in 1994. Around the same time, Tropical Storm Ileana paralleled the southwestern coast of Mexico, bringing heavy rainfall to the region. Forming in mid-August, Hurricane Lane became the first Category 5 hurricane to form during the year. Lane brought record rainfall to Hawaii's Big Island, becoming the wettest tropical cyclone for that state and the second wettest in the United States. September saw the formation of five tropical cyclonesOlivia, Paul, Nineteen-E, Rosa, and Sergio. Hurricane Olivia became the first tropical cyclone in recorded history to make landfall on the islands of Maui and Lanai on September 12. Tropical Depression Nineteen-E formed in the Gulf of California on September 19, the first such instance in recorded history. It made landfall in Sonora on the next day, causing severe flooding. Additionally, one named storm formed in the Central Pacific in SeptemberWalaka. In October, Walaka intensified into a Category 5 hurricane in the Central Pacificthe season's second Category 5 storm.

October yielded an above-average number of tropical cyclones with three named storms formingTara, Vicente, and Willa. Sergio became the eighth system to obtain Category 4 intensity during the season, breaking the old record of seven which was set in 2015. Rosa and Sergio both made landfall on the Baja California Peninsula during October, bringing gale-force winds and rain to the region before impacting western Mexico. Willa became the season's third Category 5 hurricane before making landfall in Sinaloa, Mexico, in late October. The cyclone brought strong winds to the area where it made landfall and dropped torrential rainfall throughout the region. Tropical Storm Vicente caused severe flooding and landslides in western Mexico at the same time as Willa, compounding the latter's effects in some areas. November featured the season's last system, Tropical Storm Xavier, which dissipated on November 6, marking the end of the season.

Systems

Tropical Depression One-E

In early May, a disturbance formed within the Intertropical Convergence Zone (ITCZ), south of the Gulf of Tehuantepec. The system propagated westward over the next several days, spawning an area of low pressure on May 8. Convection or thunderstorm activity initially decreased, before steadily increasing and organizing around the system's center on May 10. Moderate-to-high wind shear produced by an upper-level trough located to the west prevented the depression from strengthening any further as it continued westward. By 18:00 UTC on May 11, the depression had weakened into a remnant low after losing all of its convection as a result of the increasing shear.

Hurricane Aletta

A tropical wave departed from the western coast of Africa on May 22. The wave traversed the Atlantic Ocean and Caribbean, before later crossing over Central America and entering the Pacific Ocean. Convection associated with the system increased on June 3 while it was located south of the Gulf of Tehuantepec. Over the next couple of days, the system continued to organize, with banding features becoming established. At that time, the system was located within favorable environmental conditions of near sea surface temperatures and very low wind shear.

The depression intensified into Tropical Storm Aletta at 06:00 on June 6, and gradually strengthened over the next day before rapid intensification ensued. Meanwhile, the hurricane was traveling north of west by the flow of a subtropical ridge, which was located over the southwestern United States. Aletta began to rapidly weaken on June 9 after it moved into a region of cooler sea surface temperatures and stable air. The system was downgraded to a remnant low at 12:00 UTC on June 11 after it lost all of its convection. Aletta's remnants were influenced by a surface flow for several days before they dissipated.

Hurricane Bud

A tropical wave departed from the western coast of Africa on May 29 and propagated westward across the Atlantic Ocean, eventually entering the Eastern Pacific on June 6. Associated convective activity increased considerably on June 8 as the result of a nearby Kelvin wave. At that time, the storm was moving in a west-northwest to northwest direction around a mid-level ridge that was located over Mexico. The depression quickly strengthened into Tropical Storm Bud and rapidly intensified thereafter due to warm sea surface temperatures and abundant mid-level moisture. Bud became a hurricane at 18:00 UTC on June 10 and a Category 3 major hurricane by 12:00 UTC on June 11. After Bud's peak intensity, the hurricane rapidly weakened back to a tropical storm. Moderately warm sea surface temperatures allowed Bud to maintain some of its strength, although its structure degraded as it approached Baja California Sur. Increasing wind shear and the mountainous terrain of Baja California Sur caused Bud to weaken into a post-tropical cyclone by 12:00 UTC.

Hurricane Bud prompted the issuance of tropical cyclone watches and warnings along Baja California Sur and the northwestern coast of Mexico. Strong wind gusts were recorded in Baja California, causing minimal damage. Despite remaining offshore for most of its track, the hurricane caused torrential rainfall and severe flooding in several regions. In Guadalajara, Jalisco, hundreds of vehicles were inundated and swept away. A canal overflowed in Guadalajara, causing damage to multiple stores in a mall. At least 100 additional structures were damaged in the city. In Guerrero, hundreds of businesses and homes were flooded. Over 100 businesses in Pie de la Cuesta were damaged by strong waves. More than 60 homes in Maruata, Michoacán, experienced flood or wind damage. Heavy rainfall from Bud generated currents that swept away a child who was crossing a road in Mexico City. The remnants of Bud brought moisture to drought-stricken regions of the Southwestern United States, and slowed the advance of wildfires in Colorado and Wyoming.

Tropical Storm Carlotta

A low-pressure area developed on June 12 south of the Gulf of Tehuantepec. The nascent depression tracked north-northeastward toward the Mexican coast. Wind shear prevented strengthening initially, but the depression became Tropical Storm Carlotta around 18:00 UTC on June 15. The storm temporarily stalled on June 16 just off the coast of Acapulco. Land interaction, dry air, and increasing wind shear caused the storm to weaken as it progressed to the west-northwest. Carlotta weakened to a tropical depression late on June 17, and deteriorated into a remnant low by early on June 19. The system dissipated offshore between
Manzanillo and Zihuatanejo, Mexico shortly after.

Tropical Storm Carlotta warranted the issuance of tropical storm watches and warnings along the southern coast of Mexico. Carlotta caused severe flooding in the states of Aguascalientes, Guerrero, Michoacán, Oaxaca, and Puebla, as well as the Yucatán Peninsula; the storm also killed a total of three people. Carlotta and two other systems dropped  of rain across the Yucatán Peninsula, resulting in severe flooding. In Oaxaca, dwellings, a hospital, utilities, and roads and bridges sustained wind and flood damage. Multiple rivers overflowed their banks in Michoacán, flooding several homes and damaging water pumps. Carlotta also caused several landslides throughout the state. Insurance claims related to the storm reached US$7.6 million (MX$156 million) statewide. Another 12 houses were flooded in Aguascalientes.

Tropical Storm Daniel

The dissipating Tropical Storm Carlotta dragged a part of the ITCZ northward. This resulted in the formation of an area of thunderstorms on June 18, and after a tropical wave entered the region, a weak low-pressure area developed on June 21. Throughout the day, the storm was propelled northward by a mid- to upper-level low that was located to the west. Around 12:00 UTC, the depression strengthened into Tropical Storm Daniel as a result of warm sea surface temperatures and low wind shear. It maintained this intensity for twelve hours before succumbing to decreasing sea temperatures as it traveled northwestward. The remnants of the storm journeyed south of west under the influence of the low-level trade winds, before later opening up into a trough on June 28.

Tropical Storm Emilia

A well-defined tropical wave departed from the western coast of Africa during the middle of June 14. It moved across the Atlantic Ocean without development, and the wave entered the Pacific Ocean on June 24. There, its convection increased as it interacted with the Pacific monsoon trough. The depression slowly intensified, becoming Tropical Storm Emilia around 12:00 UTC on June 28. The storm briefly maintained this intensity before a combination of shear, mid-level dry air, and cooling sea surface temperatures caused it to weaken. By 12:00 UTC on June 30, Emila had weakened into a tropical depression. The system decayed into a remnant low by 00:00 UTC on July 2 as it continued west-northwest.

Hurricane Fabio

A tropical wave emerged from the western coast of Africa on June 16, and ten days later it crossed Central America into the Eastern Pacific Ocean. Convection increased markedly thereafter as the wave continued westward for the next couple of days, developing a low-pressure area on June 28. A mid-level ridge located over central Mexico steered the nascent depression towards the west-northwest as the storm continued to intensify. The depression strengthened into Tropical Storm Fabio around 06:00 UTC on July 1. Located within a favorable environment of warm sea surface temperatures, moist air, and low wind shear, Fabio continued to consolidate over the next couple of days. Fabio became a Category 1 hurricane around 12:00 UTC on July 2.

After 12 hours at peak intensity, Fabio began to decay as a result of having tracked into a region of cooler, sub  sea surface temperatures; the storm later rapidly weakened as it moved over sea surface temperatures near or below . Fabio's convection degraded significantly as it entered a more stable environment; it weakened into a post-tropical cyclone by 06:00 UTC on July 6.

Tropical Storm Gilma

A tropical wave exited the western coast of Africa on July 13, and moved across the Atlantic, eventually entering the Pacific Ocean on July 22. Over the next couple of days, the wave continued westward with its convection pulsing intermittently. Over the next 12 hours, the nascent depression traveled northwest along the south-southwestern edge of a mid-level ridge while intensifying; the system became Tropical Storm Gilma six hours after formation. The tropical storm began to succumb to increasing northwesterly wind shear soon after, resulting in the degradation of its convection; Gilma weakened into a tropical depression by 18:00 UTC on the same day. The depression had limited thunderstorm activity over the next couple of days before weakening into a remnant low around 12:00 UTC on July 29.
Hawaii.

Tropical Depression Nine-E

Over the next several days, the system moved westward while experiencing northeasterly wind shear, which was imparted by an upper-level trough. The aforementioned combined with a moderately dry environment prevented the low-pressure trough from organizing further. The system generated some convection on July 23, but increasing wind shear prevented significant organization until July 26. The system reached a col or neutral point between the upper-level trough to the east and an upper-level ridge to the west. The depression's convection was quickly removed to the south and west of its center as it entered a region of higher wind shear. The remnants produced sporadic convection as they continued westward over the Central Pacific during the next few days before dissipating.

Hurricane Hector

A disturbance began generating thunderstorms as it traveled across northern South America. The system entered the Eastern Pacific Ocean on July 25, and a low-pressure trough formed on the next day to the south of Central America and Mexico. The trough moved westward for several days before a passing Kelvin wave improved the environment; this allowed the trough's convection to gradually become more organized. The depression strengthened into Tropical Storm Hector about 12 hours later, at 00:00 UTC on August 1.

Hector was steered westward during the next several days. The storm was located over warm sea surface temperatures, fueling a 30-hour period of rapid intensification. Hector reached its initial peak on August 2 at 18:00 UTC as a  Category 2 hurricane. Shortly after, northerly shear abraded the northern eyewall of the hurricane before intensification resumed later on August 3. After entering the Central Pacific Ocean, Hector tracked west-northwest. The storm's movement gradually shifted westward over the next few days. During this time, lower sea surface temperatures and ocean heat content as well as mid-level dry air caused Hector to gradually weaken into a low-end Category 3 storm. The storm began to intensify again on the next day as a result of improving environmental conditions. Hector reached its secondary peak as a  Category 4 hurricane at 18:00 UTC on August 10. Afterward, Hector tracked towards the west-northwest and later northwest. Southerly shear imparted by an upper-level low caused gradual weakening over the next few days. Hector weakened into a tropical storm around 00:00 UTC on August 13. The storm crossed the International Date Line over 12 hours later, entering the western Pacific Ocean.

Hector approached several islands on its journey through the Central Pacific Ocean, prompting the issuance of tropical storm watches and warnings for islands in Papahānaumokuākea Marine National Monument as well as Johnston Atoll. Overall, the impact to land was minimal; high surf was reported along the southern shores of Hawaii's Big Island and several dozen people were rescued on Oahu. During Hector's track across the Eastern Pacific, it spent more consecutive days as a major hurricane than any other storm.

Tropical Storm Ileana

A tropical wave left the western coast of Africa on July 26 with minimal convection. The wave moved across the tropics and the Caribbean Sea before traversing Central America and entering the Eastern Pacific Ocean on August 4. The larger disturbance imparted northwesterly wind shear, uncovering the low-level center and preventing further intensification for multiple hours. Despite the shear, a central dense overcast soon developed near the depression's center. The system was upgraded into Tropical Storm Ileana around 12:00 UTC on August 5. Warm sea surface temperatures allowed Ileana to strengthen further as it tracked west-northwest, just off the southwestern coast of Mexico. A combination of disruption from Hurricane John located to the west, as well as the Sierra Madre mountains, caused the storm's structure to decay over the next day. Ileana was absorbed into John's outer bands around 12:00 UTC on August 7, just off the coast from Cabo Corrientes, Mexico.

Tropical Storm Ileana's close proximity to the Mexican coast prompted the issuance of tropical cyclone watches and warnings. Ileana impacted multiple states, causing damaging floods and eight deaths. The storm caused flooding, which inundated houses and streets, as well as power outages in the state of Guerrero. Ileana left a total of four people dead in the state. In the nearby state of Oaxaca, rainfall peaking at  caused a landslide that destroyed a house. Another four individuals were killed within the state of Chiapas. The cyclone caused US$737,000 (MX$13.6 million) in damage to roads in Michoacán.

Hurricane John

An enervated tropical wave departed from the western coast of Africa on July 25. It then traveled westward across the tropical Atlantic, with most of its convection located within the ITCZ until it arrived at South America on July 30. The wave entered the Eastern Pacific two days later and convection drastically increased as a result of the active portion of the Madden–Julian oscillation. An area of low pressure formed on August 4 and became more organized over the day. The depression then strengthened into Tropical Storm John about 12 hours later as it traveled along the edge of a mid-level ridge, which was located over Mexico. A period of rapid intensification ensued as a result of John being located in a favorable environment of low wind shear, warm sea surface temperatures, and a high quantity of mid-level moisture.

A combination of increasing northwesterly wind shear and cooling sea surface temperatures caused John to fall below hurricane strength on August 9. Although John never made landfall, it produced high surf along the coastlines of Baja California Sur and Southern California.

Tropical Storm Kristy

A tropical wave departed from the western coast of Africa on July 22 and traveled quickly across the Atlantic Ocean and the Caribbean Sea. The wave remained without convection until it entered the Caribbean Sea and moved over South America from July 27–29. Convection began to increase overland before the wave crossed into the Eastern Pacific on July 29–30. Continuing westward, the system slowly organized over the next several days, exhibiting intermittent convection and improving cloud cover. Deep convection increased near the system's center on August 6, resulting in the formation of a tropical depression by 18:00 UTC. During August 7, Kristy became embedded within deep-layer easterlies affiliated with a subtropical ridge which was located to the northeast; this steered the storm westward. The storm continued to increase in organization because it was located within a favorable environment of warm sea surface temperatures and low wind shear. An upper-level low located to the northwest imparted northwesterly wind shear and dry air, causing Kristy to weaken slightly late on August 7.

Hurricane John eroded the subtropical ridge on August 8, causing Kristy to track towards the northwest. The storm resumed strengthening on the same day as wind shear decreased. The cyclone maintained this intensity for around 12 hours before wind shear increased once more and sea surface temperatures cooled. This caused Kristy to rapidly weaken to a tropical depression by 12:00 UTC on August 11. While the storm lost most of its convection as it weakened, it still produced bursts of convection. Kristy was downgraded to a remnant low on August 12 at 12:00 UTC after having been devoid of convection. The remnants then traveled westward as a swirl of low-level clouds before dissipating on August 13.

Hurricane Lane

A tropical wave departed from the western coast of Africa on July 31 and traveled westward across the Atlantic Ocean with limited thunderstorm activity. The wave entered the Pacific Ocean on August 8 and became more organized by August 11, however, development was significantly impeded after convection became sporadic. A low-pressure area developed on August 13 and gained banding features as it strengthened. At that time, the depression was tracking west-southwest under the influence of a subtropical ridge, which was located to the north. Over the next few days, the ridge weakened, allowing for a westward and later west-northwestward movement. The depression strengthened into Tropical Storm Lane by 12:00 UTC on August 15.

Soon after, a period of rapid intensification commenced as Lane entered a favorable environment of warm sea surface temperatures, low wind shear, and moist air. Lane became a hurricane by 00:00 UTC on August 17 and reached its initial peak as a  Category 4 major hurricane by 12:00 UTC on the next day. The cyclone began to weaken after entering the Central Pacific due to moderate southwesterly wind shear imparted by an upper-level trough located near the Hawaiian Islands. Lane continued slightly north of west after it bottomed out as a Category 3 storm on August 19. Wind shear decreased by midday August 20, allowing Lane to intensify once more. Over the next few days, Lane weakened as it tracked north-northwest into a region of high wind shear. The cyclone weakened below Category 3 status early on August 24 and then rapidly weakened into a tropical storm by 06:00 UTC on August 25. The storm then turned westward, away from the Hawaiian Islands, while continuing to weaken. Lane fell to tropical depression status by 12:00 UTC on August 26, and became a tropical storm again a day later despite the shear. The remnants traveled northward and dispersed 12 hours later.

Hurricane Lane warranted the issuance of tropical cyclone watches and warnings for the Hawaiian Islands as it remained in close proximity to them for multiple days. Although the core of Lane remained off-shore, the hurricane dropped a record  in Akaka Falls State Park on Hawaii's Big Island. This made Lane the wettest tropical cyclone on record for the state of Hawaii; it is also second wettest in the United States, behind 2017's Hurricane Harvey. Landslides on the Big Island covered highways and destroyed multiple homes. Rivers exceeded their banks, flooding homes and necessitating the rescue of 100 people. The excessive rainfall caused sewer pipes to overflow, dumping 9 million US gallons (30 million liters) of raw sewage into Hilo Bay. Damage on the island totaled about US$25 million. Windgusts from the cyclone sparked wildfires in the Kauaula Valley on Maui, burning  and causing over US$4.3 million in damage. A man drowned in a river near Koloa on Kauaʻi. Overall, the total losses from Lane exceeded US$250 million. President Donald Trump signed a disaster declaration on September 27 for all counties except Honolulu, allowing FEMA to provide about US$10 million in aid. The Hawaii County Council used US$10 million from its budget to help repair county facilities; the cost to repair roads and bridges was estimated at US$35 million.

Hurricane Miriam

A tropical wave departed from the western coast of Africa on August 14 and traveled westward with minimal convection. Thunderstorm activity increased by August 15–16 before dwindling as the wave encountered drier, stabler air as well as easterly wind shear. The wave moved across the southern Windward Islands, northern South America, and the southern Caribbean Sea before crossing into the Pacific Ocean on August 20. The wave then entered a favorable environment which caused convection to increase. The system gradually organized over the next several days as it tracked west-northwest. The depression strengthened into Tropical Storm Miriam six hours later.

The storm encountered moderate northwesterly wind shear after turning westward later in the day; this caused Miriam's intensification to halt. Two days later, the wind shear subsided, allowing convection to reignite around Miriam's uncovered low-level center. Soon after, the cyclone was forced northwestward and later northward between a mid-level ridge which was located over the southwestern United States and an upper-level trough which was located northeast of Hawaii. Shortly after peaking, high southwesterly wind shear and cooling sea surface temperatures caused Miriam to rapidly weaken. The cyclone fell to tropical storm status by 18:00 UTC on September 1 as its low-level center became entirely vulnerable. Wind shear increased even further, preventing the reformation of convection near the storm's center. The low continued northwest before opening up into a trough around 06:00 UTC on September 3.

Hurricane Norman

A tropical wave left the western coast of Africa on August 14 and tracked westward across the tropics with little convection. The wave moved over Central America and entered the Pacific Ocean on August 22. Convection subsequently increased and became better organized over the next couple of days. An area of low-pressure developed and convection gradually became more organized. The depression strengthened into Tropical Storm Norman about six hours later.

The cyclone began traveling towards the west-northwest shortly after, moving along the southern edge of a subtropical ridge that extended over the Eastern Pacific Ocean. Located within a favorable environment of moist air, low wind shear, and  sea surface temperatures, Norman began a two-day period of rapid intensification around 18:00 UTC on August 28. The storm strengthened into a hurricane one day later. During this time, the hurricane turned westward and later towards the west-southwest as the ridge consolidated and extended further west. Increasing northeasterly wind shear caused Norman to gradually weaken over the next couple of days. The storm fell to Category 2 status by 06:00 UTC on September 1 and maintained that intensity for around a day. Norman then began tracking west-northwestward while the wind shear relaxed, allowing for another period of rapid strengthening.

Soon after, the hurricane began to weaken once more as it traveled through a region of cooler sea surface temperatures. Norman crossed into the Central Pacific after 00:00 UTC on September 4 as a high-end Category 1 hurricane. The weakening trend continued as Norman tracked westward under the influence of a subtropical ridge that was located to the north and northeast; the cyclone's eye filled in with clouds. The hurricane began a third period of rapid intensification as it moved across warmer sea surface temperatures and an area of low wind shear. Norman reached its tertiary peak intensity on September 5 at 18:00 UTC as a  Category 3 hurricane; at that time, it possessed a well-defined eye. On the next day, declining sea surface temperatures and moderate wind shear caused Norman to weaken as it turned northwest. By 18:00 UTC on September 7, Norman had weakened into a tropical storm, while over several hundred miles northeast of the Hawaiian Islands. Wind shear further increased as the system turned northward, exposing the low-level center and prompting more weakening. Norman was downgraded to a post-tropical cyclone around 00:00 UTC on September 9.

Hurricane Olivia

A disturbance spawned over the southwestern Caribbean Sea on August 26 and tracked westward, crossing over Central America and entering the Pacific Ocean a couple of days later. Associated convection increased as the disturbance gradually organized over the next few days. The nascent depression tracked west-northwestward as northeasterly shear inhibited the system from intensifying for nearly a day. The storm then moved northwest and strengthened gradually before the shear abated on September 3. The cyclone reached its initial peak intensity as a high-end Category 3 hurricane by 00:00 on September 5.

Soon after, increasing shear and dry air caused Olivia to weaken. The storm weakened into a minimal Category 2 hurricane before an unexpected, second period of intensification commenced on September 6. Lower sea surface temperatures and a more stable environment caused the hurricane to begin weakening before it crossed into the Central Pacific around 00:00 September 9. This trend continued until slightly higher sea surface temperatures allowed the now-minimal Category 1 hurricane to restrengthen slightly and reach a secondary peak by 00:00 UTC on September 10. After 12 hours, the cyclone began to weaken again, falling to tropical storm strength by 06:00 UTC on September 11. Olivia's two landfalls were the first time in recorded history that a tropical cyclone had made landfall on both islands. The storm moved west-southwestward, away from the Hawaiian Islands, and weakened into a tropical depression on September 13 at 06:00 UTC. Olivia became a tropical storm once more by 18:00 UTC but failed to intensify further. Strong wind shear and disruption from its two landfalls in Hawaii caused the cyclone to become post-tropical by 06:00 UTC on September 14 and open up into a trough about 12 hours later.

Olivia's approach towards the Hawaiian Islands prompted the issuance of tropical storm watches and warnings for Hawaii County, Oahu, Maui County, and Kauai County. Hawaii Governor David Ige declared Hawaii, Maui, Kalawao, Kauai, and Honolulu counties disaster areas prior to Olivia's landfall in order to activate emergency disaster funds and management. Olivia made brief landfalls in northwest Maui and Lanai on September 12, becoming the first tropical cyclone to impact the islands in recorded history. Tropical-storm-force winds mainly affected Maui County and Oahu. On Maui, Olivia felled trees, caused thousands of power outages, and caused severe flooding. Multiple homes and vehicles were swept away by floodwaters. Olivia left the valley without potable water for more than a week. Several hundred power outages occurred on Molokai, and around 1,100 lost power in Honolulu. A pipe overflowed from excessive rainfall on Oahu, sending raw sewage into Kapalama Stream and Honolulu Harbor. President Donald Trump issued a disaster declaration for Hawaii to aid with emergency response efforts. Olivia caused a total of US$25 million in damage throughout Hawaii.

Tropical Storm Paul

A tropical wave departed from the western coast of Africa on August 17. It then moved westward across the Atlantic Ocean with minimal convection until it crossed over Central America, entering the Eastern Pacific Ocean. Convection began to increase during the next few days, but this trend was hampered by strong northeasterly wind shear. The system produced sporadic convection until September 8, when thunderstorm activity became continuous. The system intensified into Tropical Storm Paul by 00:00 UTC on September 9. The storm traveled westward before turning northwest as it rounded the southwestern edge of a mid-level ridge, which was located over Central Mexico.

By September 10, Paul began to be affected by an unfavorable environment of dry air, wind shear, and cooling sea surface temperatures. This caused the storm to weaken into a tropical depression by 06:00 UTC on September 11. A low-level ridge located north of the remnants caused them to return to a westward motion for a couple of days, before a high-pressure system located over the Central Pacific caused them to quickly turn southwestward. The system became elongated and dissipated by 00:00 UTC on September 15.

Tropical Depression Nineteen-E

A tropical wave departed from the western coast of Africa on August 29 and traveled across the tropical Atlantic before reaching the Pacific Ocean around September 6–7. The wave then meandered south of Mexico for around a week. Around the same time, a mid-level trough, which was moving southward, sent moisture into the region. This allowed a surface trough to develop in a north to south orientation over Baja California Sur and the Gulf of California. Initially quite disorganized, thunderstorm activity gathered around a circulation center on September 19, causing a tropical depression to spawn around 12:00 UTC, just off the coast of Loreto, Mexico. This made the system the first tropical cyclone to form in the Gulf of California in recorded history. Wind shear and land interaction inhibited further intensification before the cyclone made landfall between Guaymas and Ciudad Obregón on the Sonoran coast, around 03:00 UTC on September 20.

Tropical Depression Nineteen-E brought torrential rainfall to western Mexico, with a peak total of  occurring in Ahome, Sinaloa. In Nogales, Sonora, over 300 metric tons (330.7 US tons) of debris had to be cleared from roadways. Floodwaters killed and swept away the bodies of two people in the state. The depression directly killed five people and indirectly killed two in Sinaloa state. Over 300,000 structures were inundated in state, leaving behind US$165.8 million (MX$3.182 billion) in flood damage. The storm caused an additional US$41 million (MX$800 million) in damage after destroying  of crops and associated equipment. Nineteen-E also left over 500,000 livestock dead in the state. The cyclone killed another three people in Chihuahua state. The remnants of Nineteen-E drew moisture from the Gulf of Mexico and entered the U.S. states of Arizona, Texas, Oklahoma, and Arkansas, causing US$250 million in damage. The highest rainfall in the United States, occurred in Johnston County, Oklahoma. One person was killed by flooding in the state of Texas. Fonden announced that it would provide US$1.5 million (MX$33 million) for the reconstruction of Culican, Sinaloa, in 2019. Two children lost their lives due to an unrepaired storm sewer, which had been damaged during the storm, before the damage was fixed in September 2019.

Hurricane Rosa

A robust tropical wave departed from the western coast of Africa on September 6 and was located south of the Gulf of Tehuantepec by September 22. Upon arrival, thunderstorm activity increased significantly and the system developed a center of circulation. Despite being affected by northeasterly shear, the depression developed banding features. This increase in organization led to the depression becoming Tropical Storm Rosa around 12:00 UTC on the same day. While tracking northwest, Rosa began to develop a low-level eye feature. A period of rapid intensification ensued with Rosa becoming a hurricane at 12:00 UTC on September 26. This trend continued as Rosa turned more westward. An eyewall replacement cycle began shortly after, causing a period of weakening to commence. As Rosa turned northwestward, a worsening environment aloft caused the weakening trend to continue. The cyclone was tracking northeastward by September 30 and rapidly weakened. Rosa interacted with mountainous terrain after landfall and dissipated by 18:00 UTC.

Rosa warranted the issuance of tropical storm watches and warnings along the western and eastern coasts of the Baja California Peninsula. Rainfall from Rosa was heaviest in Baja California, with a peak total of  occurring in Percebu. Flooding caused road damage and sinkholes in San Felipe, Baja California; the town's port lost US$530,000 (MX$10 million) after having been closed. In Sonora, thunderstorms caused power outages and flooding; the flooding swept away vehicles, left roadways impassable, damaged dozens of homes and businesses, and killed one woman. In the United States, Rosa's remnants caused torrential rainfall and flooding in the Four Corners region;  of rain was reported at Towers Mountain, Arizona. In addition to flooding, Rosa's remnants caused power outages, several dozen accidents near Phoenix, and two traffic-related deaths outside Phoenix. A community near Sells, Arizona had to be evacuated on October 2 after an earthen dam neared maximum capacity; the dam did not breach and residents were allowed to return two weeks later. Damage caused by Rosa's remnants totaled about US$50 million in the Southwestern United States.

Hurricane Sergio

A disturbance located over South America on September 24 crossed over Central America during the next couple of days. Convection associated with the system increased, however, the system remained quite disorganized. Continual convection occurred by September 28 as the system began producing gale-force winds. A low-level center developed on September 29 and became better defined. During its first few days, Sergio tracked westward and later towards the west-southwest. It only slowly strengthened as a result of its large size and dry air entanglement. The cyclone became a hurricane at about 00:00 UTC on October 2 after its eyewall fully closed. The storm then rapidly intensified over the next day. An eyewall replacement cycle that took place during October 3 caused the intensification to temporarily cease; Sergio began to intensify again by 18:00 UTC.

A second eyewall replacement cycle caused the cyclone to weaken into a Category 3 on October 5 before it reintensified later in the day. Sergio traveled towards the west and west-southwest throughout this period. The cyclone went through a third eyewall replacement cycle on October 8 as it tracked northeastward. Sergio acquired annular characteristics as it weakened slightly during the next couple of days. The storm then quickly weakened as it was propelled towards the Baja California Peninsula. Sergio made landfall near Los Castros, Baja California Sur around 12:00 UTC on October 12 with  winds. Sergio dissipated over mountainous terrain a few hours later.

Sergio necessitated the issuance of tropical storm watches and warnings for the Baja California Peninsula. Gale-force winds damaged infrastructure in Guaymas, Sonora, causing US$2.12 million (MX$40 million) in damage. Houses were inundated by floodwaters in the states of Sonoroa and Chihuahua, leaving behind damage. Moisture from Sergio's remnants led to the development of thunderstorms over Texas around October 12–13. Ten tornadoes spawned across the state as a result, collectively inflicting about US$445,000 in damage. Strong winds and hail from the thunderstorms caused another US$30,000 in damage. Sergio's remnants also caused flash flooding in the state of Arizona, dealing US$73,000 in damage.

Hurricane Walaka

A weak surface trough entered the Central Pacific Ocean on September 26 and continued westward for the next couple of days. The system began to organize on September 29 as continual convection and banding features developed near its center. A favorable environment below the storm and aloft allowed Walaka to rapidly intensify into a hurricane by 18:00 UTC on September 30. The cyclone's eye and the surrounding clouds became well established late on October 1. This intensity made Walaka the fourth major hurricane in the Central Pacific and second Category 5 hurricane of the season.

After peaking, Walaka began to undergo an eyewall replacement cycle. The cyclone weakened into a minimal Category 4 hurricane by 00:00 UTC on October 3 before briefly reintensifying later in the day. Increasing wind shear and lower sea surface temperatures caused Walaka to quickly weaken over the next couple of days, with the system falling to tropical storm strength by 06:00 UTC on October 5. Walaka transitioned into an extratropical system by 12:00 UTC on October 6 as it traveled north-northeastward. The extratropical system continued in that direction and dissipated by 18:00 UTC on October 7.

Tropical cyclone watches and warnings were issued for Johnston Atoll and the Northwestern Hawaiian Islands as a result of the threat Walaka posed. Walaka's only impact to land was that its storm surge completely destroyed East Island, wiping out the nesting grounds for the endangered green sea turtle and critically endangered Hawaiian monk seal.

Tropical Storm Tara

A low-level gyre located over Central America, which was also associated with the formation of Hurricane Michael in the Caribbean Sea, contributed to the genesis of Tropical Storm Tara. During the period of October 7–10, the disturbance moved into the Gulf of Tehuantepec, after which convection increased. The system then traveled west-northwest over the next several days, parallel to the western coast of Mexico. The nascent depression turned from the west-northwest to the north-northwest as it tracked through a weakness in a trough located over northern Baja California and a mid-level high located over the Gulf of Mexico.

Steering currents around Tara significantly weakened, almost halting the cyclone's forward motion. A combination of land interaction and increasing southeasterly wind shear caused weakening to commence. Tara opened into a trough just west of Manzanillo around 00:00 on October 17 and dissipated soon after.

Tropical Storm Vicente

A tropical wave departed from the western coast of Africa on October 6 and traveled westward, arriving at Central America on October 16. Soon after, convection formed along the monsoon trough near the wave. Convection increased and gradually organized over the next few days. Located within a favorable environment, the nascent depression quickly became better organized, developing banding features around its center. This led to the development of Tropical Storm Vicente by 18:00 UTC on the same day. Vicente began traveling west-northwest on October 20, just off the coast of southeastern Mexico.

During the overnight, Vicente began tracking westward. Dry air intrusion caused the tropical storm to weaken on October 21 as it traveled south of west. The dry air abated on October 22, allowing for some re-intensification. Outflow from Hurricane Willa, which was located to the northwest, produced northerly wind shear, which caused Vicente to weaken to a tropical depression by 06:00 UTC on October 23. Vicente made landfall near Playa Azul in Michoacán around 13:30 UTC and dissipated by 18:00 UTC after interacting with land.

Heavy rainfall caused flooding and landslides in Oaxaca, leaving 13 people dead. Roadways in the state suffered severe damage after dozens of landslides occurred. Flood waters swept away cars, created a sinkhole, and inundated dozens of homes and businesses. Flooding in the state of Veracruz left another three people dead. Nearly two dozen landslides occurred in the state, damaging over three dozen roads and schools. The overflow of the Coatzacoalcos River flooded several hundred houses. The storm left agricultural losses of US$7.05 million (MX$136 million) in Colima state.

Hurricane Willa

A tropical wave departed from the western coast of Africa on October 2 and moved across the tropical Atlantic with minimal convection. The wave arrived at Central America on October 15 and entered the Pacific Ocean on the next day. Convection formed around the wave on October 17; a low-pressure system developed in association with the wave early on October 18. The system tracked west-northwest and northwest as it continued to organize. A favorable environment along with Willa's smaller size allowed the cyclone to rapidly intensify for nearly two days. Willa reached hurricane intensity by 06:00 UTC on October 21 and became a major hurricane around 18:00 UTC.

After peaking, a combination of cooling sea surface temperatures and an eyewall replacement cycle caused Willa to steadily weaken. The hurricane's eye increased sixfold in size between Willa's peak intensity and the start of October 23. After the replacement cycle ended later that day, the now-Category 3 hurricane tracked northeastward. The storm dissipated six hours later and sent remnant moisture into southern Texas and Louisiana.

Hurricane Willa necessitated the issuance of tropical cyclone watches and warnings along the southwestern coast of Mexico. As a precautionary measure, over 200,000 people were evacuated from coastal regions in advance of the storm. Willa wrought catastrophic damage throughout the region where it made landfall, with damage totaling US$825 million (MX$17.2 billion). The town of Los Sandovales in Acaponeta Municipality, Nayarit, was completely destroyed by Willa. The cyclone left a total of 9 people dead throughout four Mexican states. The storm isolated multiple communities in Sinaloa and Nayarit; the San Pedro and Acaponeta rivers flooded, leaving 180,000 people without food and outside communication for at least one week after the storm. Multiple cities in the states of Sinaloa and Nayarit were left without any potable water, and in some cases, this remained the case for several months after the storm. Around 100,000 people were left homeless in Nayarit. In Sinaloa, 2,000 families were living under plastic roofs half a year after the storm. Reconstruction in Sinaloa did not occur in the months after the storm; a state official stated it could take years to receive federal funding. Reconstruction efforts in Nayarit were hampered by the state government's bankruptcy. The Mexican federal government allocated US$94 million (MX$2.25 billion) towards Nayarit reconstruction, with work slated to begin in February 2019.

Tropical Storm Xavier

A tropical wave moved off of the western coast of Africa on October 17 and traveled westward across the tropics and the Caribbean Sea with limited thunderstorm activity. The wave moved over Central America on October 26 and later into a cyclonic gyre that extended over a large portion of the Eastern Pacific on October 31. A passing Kelvin wave fueled an increase in convection along the wave, leading to the formation of a low-pressure system. Over the next couple of days, associated convection continued to increase and organize. The nascent depression tracked towards the east-northeast between a mid-level ridge which was located to the southeast and a mid- to upper-level trough which was located to the north and northwest. Despite being located in a region of high southwesterly wind shear, disparate upper-level flows allowed the depression to intensify into Tropical Storm Xavier by 00:00 UTC on November 3. The tropical storm continued to gradually strengthen over the next day and a half.

Meanwhile, the storm turned northward and subsequently entered a region of dry mid-level air and more powerful southwesterly wind shear. This caused Xavier to quickly weaken; the low-level center completely detached from the storm's convection by 12:00 UTC on November 5. Xavier was downgraded to a post-tropical cyclone by 00:00 UTC on November 6. The remnants traveled west-northwest and later west-southwest while continuing to weaken.

Other systems

An upper-level low absorbed the remnants of Hurricane Lane to the west-northwest of Hawaii on August 29. The storm was assigned the designation 96C by the United States Naval Research Laboratory (NRL). Traversing an area of sea surface temperatures about 3.6 °F (2 °C) above-normal, the system coalesced into a subtropical storm by August 31. However, the National Oceanic and Atmospheric Administration's Satellite Products and Service Division analyzed it as a tropical storm through the Dvorak technique. The system reached its peak intensity early on September 2, displaying an eye feature. Afterward, 96C gradually began to weaken, while accelerating northward into colder waters. The system weakened into an extratropical low on September 3. The system was absorbed by a larger extratropical storm in the Bering Sea on September 4.

Storm names

The following list of names was used for named storms that form in the Northeastern Pacific Ocean during 2018. No names were retired, so this list will be used again in the 2024 season. This is the same list used in the 2012 season. The name Vicente was used for the first time this year, while the names Willa and Xavier were both used once in 1962 and 1992, respectively.

For storms that form in the Central Pacific Hurricane Center's area of responsibility, encompassing the area between 140 degrees west and the International Date Line, all names are used in a series of four rotating lists. Only the name Walaka was used during the 2018 season.

Season effects
This is a table of all the storms that formed in the 2018 Pacific hurricane season. It includes their duration, names, affected areas, damages, and death totals. Deaths in parentheses are additional and indirect (an example of an indirect death would be a traffic accident), but were still related to that storm. Damage and deaths include totals while the storm was extratropical, a tropical wave, or a low, and all the damage figures are in USD. Potential tropical cyclones are not included in this table.

See also

 Weather of 2018
 2006 Central Pacific cyclone
 2018 Atlantic hurricane season
 2017–18 Australian region cyclone season
 2018–19 Australian region cyclone season
 2018 North Indian Ocean cyclone season
 2017–18 South Pacific cyclone season
 2018–19 South Pacific cyclone season
 2017–18 South-West Indian Ocean cyclone season
 2018–19 South-West Indian Ocean cyclone season
 List of Pacific hurricanes
 Pacific hurricane season
 Tropical cyclones in 2018

Notes

References

External links

National Hurricane Center
National Hurricane Center's Eastern Pacific Tropical Weather Outlook
Servicio Meteorológico Nacional Website 
Joint Typhoon Warning Center 
Tropical Storm Risk (TSR)'s website
NHC 2018 Pacific hurricane season archive

 
Pacific hurricane seasons
2018 Epac